Murchisonella aqabaensis is a species of sea snail, a marine gastropod mollusk in the family Murchisonellidae.

Distribution
This marine species occurs in the Gulf of Aqaba, Northern Red Sea.

References

External links
 To World Register of Marine Species

Murchisonellidae
Gastropods described in 2005